The Indiana Hoosiers football program represents Indiana University Bloomington in NCAA Division I Football Bowl Subdivision college football and in the Big Ten Conference. The Hoosiers have played their home games at Memorial Stadium since 1960.

The team has won the Big Ten Championship twice, once in 1945 and again in 1967. The Hoosiers have appeared in 12 bowl games, including the 1968 Rose Bowl. Six Indiana players have been inducted into the College Football Hall of Fame, including Zora Clevinger, Bill Ingram, Pete Pihos, George Taliaferro, John Tavener, and Anthony Thompson, who was also National Player of the Year in 1989.

The Hoosiers are coached by Tom Allen.

History

Early history (1887–1957)
In the fall of 1884 the Indiana student newspaper made its first reference to football by reporting that a team was being organized. The following year, in 1885, a Yale graduate, professor Arthur B. Woodford, came to Indiana to teach political and social science and during the next year he introduced football to the school. Woodford coached the Hoosiers from 1887 to 1888. In the only documented game of the 1889 season, Indiana lost to Wabash College, 40–2. Evan Wollen led the Hoosiers to an 0–1 record.

By 1891 Billy Herod was head coach. He had never played football but had seen it played in the East. The Hoosiers continued to struggle to find wins, even forfeiting a game to in-state rival Purdue in the 1894 season. The first winning season came in 1895 under coach Dana Osgood, who led the team to a 4–3–1 record. This was followed by two winning seasons in 1896 and 1897 under coach Madison G. Gonterman, who was hired away from Harvard.

After coaching the Hoosiers to winning records in 1898 and 1899, coach James H. Horne and the football team joined the Western Conference (later the Big Ten Conference). Horne led Indiana to six .500-or-better records in his seven years. In 1905 coach James M. Sheldon took over and would have the longest tenure of a football coach at Indiana until Bo McMillin coached for 14 years (1934–1947). Sheldon proved to be one of the most successful coaches in Indiana football's early years, leading the Hoosiers to four winning seasons and as high as third in the Big Ten Conference rankings. In 1914 Indiana hired its first full-time coach, Clarence Childs, but continued to struggle to find success.

In 1922 construction began on the original Memorial Stadium. It would seat 22,000 fans and $250,000 was raised to erect the new facility. The new stadium was built on the grounds of the golf course and replaced Jordan Field, which had been the home of Indiana football since 1887.

Bo McMillin is the only person to coach Indiana to an outright Big Ten Championship. In 1945, the Hoosiers achieved their only unbeaten season (9-0-1). The achievement earned Coach McMillan the title of Man of the Year (by the Football Writers Association) and Coach of the Year (by the Football Coaches Association). Part of the team's success in this period is attributable to George Taliaferro, an African-American who helped break down color barriers in sports and played for the Hoosiers two years before Jackie Robinson suited up for the Brooklyn Dodgers. A three-time All-American, Taliaferro led the Hoosiers in rushing twice, punting in 1945 and passing in 1948. He helped lead the 1945 undefeated team. Under Coach McMillin, IU had 10 winning seasons, including a stretch of six consecutive years. His Big Ten record of 34–34–6 is the best of any Indiana coach, as is his overall winning percentage (.562). His overall record at IU is 63–48–11. On September 23, 1946, McMillin was named Indiana's athletic director.

Clyde Smith left Wisconsin La-Crosse and came to the Hoosiers as head football coach following McMillin's retirement. The Hoosiers struggled mightily under Smith, as they failed to win more than three games in a single season with Smith at the helm. Smith's final record at IU is 8–27–1. Bernie Crimmins came to Indiana from his post as an assistant under legendary coach Frank Leahy at Notre Dame and brought along high hopes that IU football prominence would be restored. However, it didn't happen. Like his predecessor, Crimmins failed to win more than three games in a single season, with yearly records of 2–7, 2–7, 3–6, 3–6 and 3–6 for a final record of 13–32 in five seasons. Crimmins was fired as head coach and returned to Notre Dame as an assistant. Bob Hicks came to Indiana from his post as an assistant at Wyoming. He took over the Hoosiers football program for one season while Phil Dickens was being investigated for alleged NCAA violations. He went 1–8 in his only season as head coach, failing to win a single Big Ten game. He returned to his post as assistant coach for the Hoosiers after Dickens was reinstated.

Phil Dickens era (1958–1964)
Coach Phil Dickens, formerly head football coach at Wyoming, guided Indiana to a fifth-place finish in the Big Ten and a 3–2–1 overall record in 1958, his first season at the helm (he sat out the 1957 season while under investigation by the NCAA). That same year construction began on the new Memorial Stadium, which is still the home of the football team today.

In the fall of 1960 the Indiana football program was hit with devastating NCAA sanctions. The sanctions resulted from violations that included the offering of free plane tickets to several athletes along with financial stipends, according to an NCAA report, while other recruits were delivered envelopes filled with cash.

Indiana denied the charges, arguing that possible recruiting violations were just the work of overzealous alumni. The NCAA, however, didn't buy the claims and saddled Indiana with four years of probation. During this time all Hoosier varsity sports were barred from postseason play. The NCAA also disallowed any Indiana win during the 1960 Big Ten season because of Indiana's improper recruiting practices. The sanctions were a stain on Indiana's notoriously clean record and undermined the ability to convince talented athletes to come to Bloomington. However, Dickens was not held responsible for the sanctions and remained on the Hoosier sidelines for another five years until 1964. Dickens' contract was not renewed after seven seasons.

John Pont era (1965–1972)
John Pont, who came to IU from Yale, took over just as the IU sanctions expired. In 1966 the team achieved only a 1–8–1 record. But the following season, in 1967, Indiana surprisingly had a 9–2 record and shared the Big Ten title with Minnesota and Purdue. The team was invited to and accepted the invitation play in the 1968 Rose Bowl (Indiana's only appearance), but lost to Southern California, the team which would be named national champions. Pont was named unanimous national coach of the year and head coach of the East team in the 1968 Coaches All-America game. With sophomore stars Harry Gonzo, John Isenbarger and Jade Butcher returning for two more years, the Hoosiers were ranked in the preseason top 10 nationally in 1968. Unfortunately, due to injuries and to the return to prominence of programs at Ohio State, Michigan and Purdue, the Hoosiers finished 6–4 in 1968 and 4–6 in 1969 (also partially due to a 14-player African American team boycott). Pont, after only winning five or more games in a single season twice after the Rose Bowl season (never more than six wins), was asked to resign after eight seasons.

Lee Corso era (1973–1982)

Lee Corso left Louisville and took over as IU head football coach in 1973, leading the Hoosiers to two winning seasons in 1979 and 1980. The 1979 regular season ended with 7–4 record and earned a trip to the 1979 Holiday Bowl; there the Hoosiers would beat the previously unbeaten BYU. Indiana's victory over the Cougars propelled the team to 16th in the UPI poll, the Hoosiers' first top-20 ranking since 1967. During one game in the 1976 season, Corso called a time out after his team scored a touchdown early in the 2nd quarter. The entire team huddled together for a photograph with the scoreboard filling the background. It read: Indiana 7, Ohio State 6. It was the first time in 25 years that the Hoosiers had led the Buckeyes in a football game. Corso's record was 41–68–2 over his ten years at Indiana. Corso was fired after ten seasons in which, other than the Holiday Bowl season, the Hoosiers only had one winning season, a 6–5 1980 season.

Sam Wyche era (1983)
For one season, Sam Wyche, formerly an assistant with the NFL's San Francisco 49ers, led the Indiana Hoosiers football program. Wyche's Hoosiers struggled to a 3–8 record in his only season at the helm of the Hoosiers. He left IU to accept an offer to become head coach of the NFL's Cincinnati Bengals.

Bill Mallory era (1984–1996)
Bill Mallory, who came to IU from Northern Illinois, took over as head football coach following Wyche's departure. Although he finished with a winless 0–11 record during his first campaign at Indiana in 1984, it would take Mallory just three seasons to lead the Hoosiers to their first bowl appearance under his direction. Indiana finished with a 6–5 regular-season record in 1986 and capped its season by playing a talented Florida State team in the 1986 All-American Bowl on New Year's Eve. Despite losing 27–13, the Hoosiers put up a good fight. Indiana running back Anthony Thompson, who was playing in his first bowl game, finished with 127 rushing yards on 28 carries.

In 1987, Mallory became the first Big Ten coach to be awarded back-to-back coach of the year honors after the Hoosiers earned an 8–4 record (with wins over Ohio State and Michigan), a second-place finish in the Big Ten, and a Peach Bowl appearance against Tennessee. In what was the first-ever meeting between the schools, Tennessee was victorious by a final score of 27–22. In 1988, Indiana finished the regular season with a 7–3–1 record, a 5–3 mark in the Big Ten, and a top-20 ranking. It earned the team a postseason berth for the third consecutive year with a game against South Carolina in the 1988 Liberty Bowl. The Hoosiers dominated the game and cruised to a 34–10 victory before 39,210 fans. Indiana set a Liberty Bowl record with 575 yards of total offense. Indiana finished with a 6–4–1 regular-season record in 1990, a mark good enough to earn the Hoosiers a berth in the Peach Bowl for a game against the Auburn Tigers, which Indiana would lose 27–23. Part of Indiana's success can be attributed to star running back Vaughn Dunbar.

In 1991 Indiana played in the Copper Bowl and dominated a highly regarded Baylor team 24–0. Led by future NFL quarterback Trent Green, it was one of the most impressive performances by any team during the 1991 bowl season. Indiana finished the 1993 season with an 8–4 record, with two of its three regular season losses by seven points or less. The team went on to play in the 1993 Independence Bowl. Coach Mallory, despite his successes, was fired after thirteen seasons, ending his career at Indiana with six bowl games overall in 13 seasons. He is Indiana's all-time winningest head football coach with 69 wins.

Cam Cameron era (1997–2001)
Washington Redskins quarterbacks coach and Indiana alumnus Cam Cameron began coaching the Hoosiers in 1997 and in five seasons compiled a record of 18–37. Cameron brought a new system and logo to the school, both in style and in substance. Cameron began by introducing a new oval logo for the football helmets (which has since been discarded). Cameron brought an explosive offense to school with highly effective offensive players such as Antwaan Randle El. Indiana averaged 23.6 points per game under Cameron's guidance. In fact, Randle El became the first player in NCAA Division I history to pass for 40 career touchdowns and score 40 career rushing touchdowns. He finished his college career as fifth on the all-time NCAA total yardage list, and became the first player in college football history to record 2,500 total yards for each of four consecutive years. Although Cameron's Indiana teams won less than one-third of their games, Indiana was recognized by the American Football Coaches Association for its exemplary football graduation rates in each of Cameron's final four seasons. Nevertheless, Cameron was fired after the 2001 season.

Gerry DiNardo era (2002–2004)
In 2002, former Vanderbilt and LSU head football coach Gerry DiNardo took over as Indiana head football coach, but finished with just an 8–27 overall record. He never won more than three games in a season, and was fired after the 2004 season.

Terry Hoeppner era (2005–2006)
In 2005 Terry Hoeppner ("Coach Hep") left Miami (OH) and was named head coach of the Hoosiers. He quickly made an impact by nearly leading the team to a bowl appearance in 2006. With 49 true or redshirt freshmen and 72 underclassmen overall, that team was the youngest team in the Big Ten. Despite such youth, the team garnered five victories, the most since the 2001 season. The 2006 Hoosiers picked up three Big Ten wins for the first time since 2001. Coach Hep rejuvenated the Indiana fan base; attendance increased 39 percent, season ticket sales increased 46 percent, and student season ticket sales increased 110 percent. In 2006, Hoeppner announced he was taking a medical leave of absence but died shortly afterward following a lengthy battle with brain cancer. Hoeppner's final record at IU was 9–14.

Bill Lynch era (2007–2010)
In 2007, Hoeppner's offensive coordinator Bill Lynch, a native Hoosier, took over the reins of the program. In his first season Lynch led Indiana to a 7–6 record (the most wins since 1993) and its first Old Oaken Bucket victory since 2001. The success earned the team a trip to the Insight Bowl. The season marked the first time that an Indiana coach guided a team to a bowl game in his first season.

The 2008 Indiana team was hampered by a number of injuries. Against Wisconsin, the Hoosiers were forced to play three quarterbacks and four centers. 13 starters in total were injured during the year. Still, Lynch was able to pull in the one of the strongest recruiting classes in recent history. 2009 showed marked improvement on the field, although the record ledger failed to show it as the team took 4th quarter leads into three Big Ten road games before falling short. During Lynch's tenure, the players established a Player's Leadership Council, which elect weekly game captains and select the community service organizations the team volunteers with. The Boys and Girls Club of Bloomington and Riley Children's Hospital of Indianapolis are two favorite causes of the team. Lynch's tenure has been noted for his strong recruiting and identifying and developing high character young men who want to be part of a family atmosphere. However, after four seasons, Lynch compiled just a 19–30 overall record and was fired by athletic director Fred Glass.

Kevin Wilson era (2011–2016)
Kevin Wilson, formerly offensive coordinator at Oklahoma, was named head coach on December 7, 2011. Wilson arrived in Bloomington with a reputation as a brilliant offensive mind, having overseen explosives offenses during his years with the Sooners and had coached 2009 Heisman Trophy winning quarterback Sam Bradford.

In Wilson's first year, the Hoosiers compiled a 1–11 record. In his second year, Indiana improved to 4–8 on the year (4 losses were by seven points or fewer), but surpassed Northwestern's record for most losses in Football Bowl Subdivision history. Nevertheless, Wilson's team exhibited an explosive offense, going from 80th nationally in pass offense to 19th and leading the Big Ten with 311.2 yards per game, in spite of losing the starting quarterback Tre Roberson in the season's second game. Additionally, Wilson was successful in luring five 4-star Rivals.com recruits from the 2013 class to Indiana, the most in school history.

Wilson's 2013 team improved to 5–7, and while the Hoosiers featured one of the Big Ten's more potent offenses (ranked 2nd in the Big Ten for 2013), the team's defense was among the conference's worst (12th in the Big Ten). The Hoosiers set school and Big Ten records for most yards and points allowed per game, and the Hoosiers lost three games in which they scored at least 35 points. Wilson fired defensive coordinator Doug Mallory following the 2013 season and replaced him with Brian Knorr, the former defensive coordinator of Wake Forest and former head coach at Ohio.

After going 6–6 overall (2–6 B1G) in the 2015 season, Wilson's Hoosiers would qualify for a bowl game, the first since 2007. The Hoosiers would eventually lose the Pinstripe Bowl to Duke by a score of 44–41 in overtime. Following the 2015 post season, on January 16, 2016, Wilson hired Tom Allen, the former defensive coordinator of USF, to replace Knorr beginning the 2016 season.

Following the end of the 2016 regular season, the Hoosiers would again finish 6–6 overall (4–5 B1G) to become bowl eligible for the second year in a row. This was the first time since 1990–1991 that the Hoosiers have gone to back-to-back bowl games. However, Wilson resigned on December 1, 2016, amidst "philosophical differences" with athletic director Fred Glass and allegations of player mistreatment. He later went on to be the offensive coordinator for the Ohio State Buckeyes football program, under Head Coach Urban Meyer.

Tom Allen era (2016–present)

On December 1, 2016, Tom Allen was named head coach. He previously served as Indiana's defensive coordinator. On December 7, the football team was invited to play in the Foster Farms Bowl on December 28, 2016, at Levi's Stadium against the Utah Utes. The bowl game served as Tom Allen's head coaching debut. On January 4, 2017, former Tennessee offensive coordinator Mike DeBord was hired to the same position for the Hoosiers. On August 3, 2017, ESPN's College GameDay announced that it will hold its first show of the season in Bloomington (and the first time it has been held in that city).

On September 9, 2017, Allen would record his first win as the head coach of the Hoosiers, defeating the Virginia Cavaliers, in Charlottesville, by a score of 34–17. The following week, Indiana University Athletics reached a mutual agreement with Florida International University to cancel its September 16 matchup, following the aftermath of Hurricane Irma in southern Florida.

Following the loss at Purdue on November 25, 2017, Allen and the Hoosiers would finish the 2017 season 5-7 overall and fail to earn a bowl appearance.

After the culmination of the 2018 season for Indiana, Allen's Hoosiers would again finish the season 5–7 overall; Indiana failed to beat Purdue in a must-win, last game of the season, to become bowl eligible. The loss to the Boilermakers would secure the Hoosiers' second-straight year without a bowl appearance. On December 27, 2018, the Hoosiers announced the promotion of Kane Wommack from linebackers coach to defensive coordinator. On December 30, 2018, Hoosiers' offensive coordinator Mike DeBord announced his retirement from football. On January 21, 2019, former Fresno State offensive coordinator Kalen DeBoer was announced as the Hoosiers' new offensive coordinator.

The Hoosiers would finish the 2019 regular season with an 8–4 overall record (5–4 B1G) and become bowl eligible by October 26; the 8–4 overall season record had not been accomplished since Indiana's 1993 season. On November 30, 2019, the Hoosiers defeated in-state rival Purdue 44–41, in two overtimes, to win the Old Oaken Bucket for the first time since 2016. On December 8, 2019, Indiana was selected as a participant in the 2020 Gator Bowl against Tennessee; the Hoosiers would go on to lose 22–23 to the Volunteers. Following the culmination of the regular season, both Allen and DeBoer would receive watchlist nominations for their respective Coach of the Year awards, including DeBoer being named a semifinalist for the Broyles Award. On December 17, 2019, Kalen DeBoer was hired by Fresno State as its newest head coach; DeBoer had served only one year as the Hoosiers' offensive coordinator. Following the departure of DeBoer to Fresno State, Indiana announced the promotion of tight ends' coach Nick Sheridan to offensive coordinator and running backs' coach Mike Hart to associate head coach.

Indiana's first game of the 2020 season took place at Memorial Stadium on October 24, 2020, against the No. 8 Penn State Nittany Lions. The Hoosiers defeated Penn State 36–35 in overtime. The Hoosiers were awarded a ranking of No. 17 following the victory. Indiana's next two games included a 37–21 victory over the Rutgers Scarlet Knights and a 38–21 victory over the No. 23 Michigan Wolverines, their first victory over them in 33 years. Following the win versus the Wolverines, the Hoosiers were ranked tenth in both the AP and coaches poll, their highest rankings since 1969 and 1992. Following the culmination of the regular season, the Hoosiers would be invited to the Outback Bowl, where they would lose by six points to Ole Miss, 26–20. Following the season defensive coordinator Kane Wommack would leave to become head coach of the South Alabama Jaguars. Indiana would hire Charlton Warren from the Georgia Bulldogs to replace him.

Following a 2–10 overall (0–9 Big Ten) finish of the 2021 season, Indiana fired Offensive Coordinator Nick Sheridan on November 28. The Hoosiers hired former UMass headcoach Walt Bell as Sheridan's replacement on December 9.

Conference affiliations
 Independent (1887–1899)
 Big Ten Conference (1900–present)
 Western Conference (1900–1952)
 Big Ten Conference (1953–present)

Conference championships
Indiana has won two conference championships, one outright and one shared.

† Co-champion

Bowl games
Indiana has participated in 13 bowl games in 120 seasons, garnering a record of 3–10 through the 2020 season. An oft-spoken mantra, coined after Terry Hoeppner's death prior to the 2007 season, is to "play 13," meaning to play an extra game (a bowl game) after the 12-game regular season.

Head coaches

Facilities

Jordan Field (1887–1924)
Created in 1887, Indiana's first athletic grounds, Jordan Field was originally named University Athletic Field before being renamed in 1898, in honor of then-Indiana University President David Starr Jordan. The field was a mixed-use facility utilized by both the football and baseball teams. Bleacher seating for 4,000 persons were added in 1901, with field drainage added the following year to alleviate flooding.

In 1904, a track and field component was added to the athletic facility; however, conditions of the field continued to be a problem for the Hoosiers. The track and field portion of Jordan Field was upgraded in 1915. A proposed stadium, north of the current facility, was planned by the university; however, the outbreak of World War I postponed construction. The football and baseball teams would continue play at Jordan Field through the end of 1923. The proposed stadium would begin construction in 1924 and would open in the fall of 1925. The final varsity athletic event for Jordan Field, a baseball game, would occur in 1950 prior to the facility being turned into a parking lot for the nearby Indiana Memorial Union.

Memorial Stadium (1925–1959)

Indiana's two Memorial Stadiums are entirely distinct venues and share only the same name, though never at the same time. The current Memorial Stadium was called Seventeenth Street Football Stadium until 1971, when it was renamed Memorial Stadium and the original stadium was renamed Tenth Street Stadium. Tenth Street Stadium hosted the Little 500 bicycle race until Bill Armstrong Stadium was built in 1981. It was demolished in the same year and its former place on campus is occupied by the arboretum.  Shortly before its demolition, the old stadium was featured in the 1979 cult movie classic Breaking Away – filmed primarily on the Indiana campus and the surrounding Bloomington, Indiana area.

Memorial Stadium (1960–present)

The current iteration of Memorial Stadium opened in 1960 as part of a new athletics area at the university and has a capacity of 52,656. It replaced the original Memorial Stadium, built in 1925, a 20,000-seat stadium located on 10th Street where the arboretum now stands. The stadium has been expanded twice since the original construction. The $38 million, 138,000-square-foot, North End Zone Student-Athlete Development Center opened in 2009. The $53 million, 66,575-square-foot, South End Zone Student-Athlete Excellence Center opened in 2018.

John Mellencamp Pavilion (1996–present)

The John Mellencamp Pavilion is the primary indoor athletics training facility of the Indiana Hoosiers's football program. It was dedicated on April 12, 1996, following a donation of $1.5 million from singer-songwriter John Mellencamp, to facilitate the project. The indoor practice facility contains a regulation-sized football field, featuring a Sportexe Momentum 41 artificial surface which was installed in 2007.

Rivalries

Purdue

Indiana's most prominent rivalry is with in-state school Purdue. The teams compete for the Old Oaken Bucket, most recently held by Indiana after defeating the Boilermakers during the 2019 season. Purdue leads the series 75-42–6 through the 2021 season.

Michigan State

Indiana has a second trophy game (for the Old Brass Spittoon) against Michigan State. The Spartans were Indiana's dedicated cross-divisional rival in the Big Ten during the era of the Legends and Leaders divisions (2011–2013).  Both teams now play in the Big Ten East division and compete annually. Michigan State leads the all-time series 48-17-2. I

Kentucky

The Hoosiers also have an out-of-conference rivalry with Kentucky. The Hoosiers played the Wildcats annually from 1987 until 2005 in what was known as the "Bourbon Barrel" game. The two teams played for a trophy called the "Bourbon Barrel" from 1987 until both schools mutually agreed to retire the trophy in 1999 following the alcohol-related death of a Kentucky football player. The two teams last met on September 17, 2005, with Indiana winning 38–14; Indiana leads the overall series (18-17-1).

Legacy
The Hoosier football program has the most all-time losses (686 as of the end of the 2020 season) in the history of NCAA Division I (now FBS) football, in addition to the tenth worst all-time winning percentage (.423) out of 128 FBS schools.  Fellow Big Ten program Northwestern is ranked 2nd in all time losses with 677, and Purdue is ranked 29th with 579 losses.  The Hoosiers have seen significant recent success, however, making it to their first bowl game since 2007, the New Era Pinstripe Bowl, in 2015, the Foster Farms Bowl in 2016, the Gator Bowl in 2019, the 2020 Outback Bowl, and finishing the 2019 regular season 8–4.  The Hoosiers experienced a very successful 2020 season, going 6–2 overall and 6–1 in the Big Ten Conference, finishing tied for 2nd for the best Big Ten record and 2nd in the Big Ten East division behind Ohio St.  Coach Tom Allen was named the 2020 Big Ten Coach of the Year and was a finalist for the 2020 Paul "Bear" Bryant Award.

Individual awards and honors

Retired numbers

National

Players
 Maxwell Award
Anthony Thompson - 1989
 Walter Camp Award
Anthony Thompson - 1989

Coach
 Paul "Bear" Bryant Award
John Pont - 1967

Big Ten Conference
Players

 Chicago Tribune Silver Football
Chuck Bennett - 1928
Vern Huffman - 1936
Corbett Davis - 1937
Tim Clifford - 1979
Anthony Thompson - 1988, 1989
Antwaan Randle El - 2001

 Player of the Year
Anthony Thompson - 1988, 1989
 Offensive Player of the Year
Antwaan Randle El - 2001
 Freshman of the Year
Antwaan Randle El - 1998

Coach
 Dave McClain Coach of the Year
Bill Mallory - 1986, 1987
Tom Allen - 2020

College Football Hall of Famers
 Zora Clevinger
 Bill Ingram
 Pete Pihos
 George Taliaferro
 John Tavener
 Anthony Thompson

Pro Football Hall of Famers
 Pete Pihos

School records

Records from the 1956 season through the 2018 season.

Career
 Passing Yards: 7,879 – Nate Sudfeld, (2012–2015)
 Receiving Yards: 2,740 – James Hardy, (2005–2007)
 Rushing Yards: 5,299 – Anthony Thompson, (1986–1989)
 Touchdowns: 65 – Anthony Thompson, (1986–1989)
 Sacks: 34.5 – Adewale Ogunleye, (1996–1999)
 Interceptions: 19 – Tim Wilbur, (1978–1982)

Season

 Passing Yards: 3,573 – Nate Sudfeld, (2015)
 Receiving Yards: 1,265 – Ernie Jones, (1987)
 Rushing Yards: 2,036 – Tevin Coleman, (2014)
 Touchdowns: 26 – Anthony Thompson, (1988)
 Sacks: 16 – Greg Middleton, (2007)
 Interceptions: 8 – Tim Wilbur, (1979)

Game
 Passing Yards: 496 – Richard Lagow vs. Wake Forest Demon Deacons, 9/24/16
 Passing Touchdowns: 6 – Tre Roberson vs. Purdue Boilermakers, 11/30/13
 Receiving Yards: 285 – Thomas Lewis at Penn State Nittany Lions, 11/6/93
 Rushing Yards: 377 – Anthony Thompson at Wisconsin Badgers, 11/11/89
 Rushing Touchdowns: 6 – Levron Williams at Wisconsin Badgers, 10/6/01
 Sacks: 4 – Van Waiters at Michigan State Spartans, 11/8/86; Adewale Ogunleye at Ohio State Buckeyes, 10/18/97; Matt Mayberry vs. Central Michigan, 11/1/08
 Interceptions: 5 players tied at 3 interceptions

Uniforms 

The Indiana football team has primarily worn a home uniform of red jerseys (usually a variation of crimson red) 
with either red or white pants for most of the program's history. There have also been different designs incorporated into the main jerseys
and pants, which have largely utilized the Block-I logo or interlocking-IU logo, striping and different variations and placement on the words 'Indiana' or 'Hoosier'. For away games the Hoosiers utilize white jerseys with white pants. Notable exceptions have also included the use of red-on-red color combinations for the jersey and pants, as well as white jerseys with red pants.

While the Hoosiers do not have designated alternate uniforms, there have been times when the uniforms were altered from their traditional design.
During the Cam Cameron era (1997–2001), the jerseys and Block-I logo were changed to a red, black and white color scheme, while also incorporating
an original design for the traditional IU athletics logo; the design and color combination were reverted to the interlocking-IU logo and official colors of Indiana following the departure of Cameron.

For the 2018 season, the rear name-plate on the jerseys were not included to keep the uniforms standardized to Indiana's tradition of "honoring "Team Over Self" by not including the players' names on backs of jerseys in any sport"; however, the rear name-plate was added back to the jersey beginning in the 2019 season.

Helmets
Indiana has historically used a variation of its red and white scheme in its helmet design. These designs have included, but are not limited to: placing the Block-I logo on either side of the helmet (as well as on the front of the helmet - 1959-1961), an all red or all white helmet, the inclusion of the aforementioned redesigned IU logo from the Cam Cameron era (1997-2001), the use of the Indiana State Flag logo on one side of the helmet, as well as an alternating red and chrome-striped helmet. Additionally, striping on the helmet have also been included on the varied designs.

Hoosiers in the NFL
 Tevin Coleman (San Francisco 49ers)
 Rodger Saffold (Buffalo Bills)
 Nate Sudfeld (Detroit Lions)
 Dan Feeney (New York Jets)
 Ian Thomas (Carolina Panthers)
 Wes Martin (Washington Commanders)
 Dan Godsil (Cincinnati Bengals)
 Nick Westbrook-Ikhine (Tennessee Titans)
 Peyton Hendershot (Dallas Cowboys)
 Caleb Jones (Green Bay Packers)
 Micah McFadden (New York Giants)

Future non-conference opponents 
Announced schedules as of November 16, 2022.

References

External links

 

 
American football teams established in 1887
1887 establishments in Indiana